A molecular logic gate is a molecule that performs a logical operation based on one or more physical or chemical inputs and a single output. The field has advanced from simple logic systems based on a single chemical or physical input to molecules capable of combinatorial and sequential operations such as arithmetic operations (i.e. moleculators and memory storage algorithms). Molecular logic gates work with input signals based on chemical processes and with output signals based on spectroscopic phenomena. 

Logic gates are the fundamental building blocks of electrical circuits. They can be used to construct digital architectures with varying degrees of complexity by a cascade of a few to several million logic gates. Logic gates are essentially physical devices that produce a singular binary output after performing logical operations based on Boolean functions on one or more binary inputs. The concept of molecular logic gates, extending the applicability of logic gates to molecules, aims to convert chemical systems into computational units. Over the past three decades, the field has evolved to realize several practical applications in molecular electronics, biosensing, DNA computing, nanorobotics, and cell imaging, among others.

Working principle 

For logic gates with a single input, there are four possible output patterns. When the input is “0”, the output can be either a “0” or “1”. When the input is “1”, the output can again be “0” or “1”. The four output bit patterns that can arise corresponds to a specific logic type: PASS 0, YES, NOT, and PASS 1. PASS 0 always outputs “0”, whatever the input. PASS 1 always outputs 1, whatever the input. YES outputs a “1” when the input is “1”, and NOT is the inverse YES – it outputs a “0” when the input is “1”. Table 1 consolidates the truth tables for the single-input PASS 0, PASS 1, YES, and NOT logic gates.

AND, OR, XOR, NAND, NOR, XNOR, and INH are two-input logic gates. The AND, OR, and XOR gates are fundamental logic gates, and the NAND, NOR, and XNOR gates are complementary to AND, OR, and XOR gates, respectively. An INHIBIT (INH) gate is a special conditional logic gate that includes a prohibitory input. When the prohibitory input is absent, the output produced depends solely on the other input, as indicated by its truth table in Table 2.

Figure 1 depicts an example of a dual-input molecular logic gate with metal ions as inputs (input "1") and fluorescence emission as output (output "1").

History and development 
One of the earliest ideas for the use of π-conjugated molecules in molecular computation was proposed by Ari Aviram from IBM in 1988. The motivation for this work was to develop theoretical models for mixed-valence type-σ-π-σ-bonded molecules and explore their stereochemical properties for potential applications in molecular devices. As depicted in Figure 2, the system comprised two π-conjugated systems, 1 and 2, made of oligothiophenes joined by a spiro linkage, and connected to gold electrodes by thiol linkers. π-system 1 is non-conducting in its neutral state, whereas system 2 is electrically conducting in its radical cation form. The twisted structure of the system courtesy of the spiro linkage provides hindrance to the transport of electrons between the two π-systems. However, through electrodes directed toward the linkage, a strong electric field could facilitate electron transfer from system 1 to system 2, with the radical cation going the opposite way.

The first practical realization of molecular logic was courtesy of de Silva and coworkers in their seminal work, in which they constructed a molecular photoionic AND gate with a fluorescent output. While a YES molecular logic gate, as described previously, can convert signals from their ionic to photonic forms (hence the term “photoionic”), they are singular-input-singular-output systems. To build more complex molecular logic architectures, two-input gates, namely AND and OR gates, are needed. Some early works made some progress in this direction, but could not realize a complete truth table as their ionic forms (protonated) could not bind to the substrate in all cases. De Silva and co. constructed an anthracene-based AND gate made up of tertiary amine and benzo-18-crown-6 units, depicted in Figure 3, both of which were known to show photoinduced electron transfer (PET) processes. In the system shown, they both acted as receptors, connected to the anthracene-based fluorophore by alkyl spacers. The PET is quenched upon coordination with protons and sodium ions, respectively, for the two receptors, and would lead the anthracene unit to fluoresce. The truth table for an AND gate was completely realized as the system would exhibit a fluorescence output only in the presence of both protons and sodium ions in the system.

Examples of molecular logic gates

YES molecular logic gate 
An example of a YES logic gate, comprising a benzo-crown-ether connected to a cyano-substituted anthracene unit, is depicted in Figure 4. An output “1” (fluorescence) is obtained only when sodium ions are present in the solution (input “1”). Sodium ions are encapsulated by the crown ether, resulting in a quenching of the PET process, and causing the anthracene unit to fluoresce.

AND molecular logic gate 
The molecular logic gate illustrated in Figure 5 demonstrates the advancement from redox-fluorescent switches to multi-input logic gates with an electrochemical switch. This two-input AND logic gate incorporates a tertiary amine proton receptor and a tetrathiafulvalene redox donor. These groups, when attached to anthracene, can simultaneously process information concerning acid concentration and oxidizing ability of the solution.

OR molecular logic gate 
De Silva et al. constructed an OR molecular logic gate using an aza-crown ether receptor and sodium and potassium ions as the inputs. The system is depicted in Figure 6. Either of the two ions could bind to the crown ether, causing the PET to be quenched and the fluorescence to be turned on. Since either of the two ions (input “1”) could turn on the fluorescence (output “1”), the system resembled an OR logic gate.

INH molecular logic gate 
The INHIBIT logic gate illustrated in Figure 7 as provided by Gunnlaugsson et al. incorporates a Tb3+ ion in a chelate complex. This two-input logic gate is the first of its kind and displays non-commutative behavior with chemical inputs and a phosphorescence output. Whenever dioxygen (input “1”) is present, the system is quenched and no phosphorescence is observed (output “0”). The second input, H+, must also be present for an output “1” to be observed. This is understood from a two-input INHIBIT truth table as included in Table 2.

NAND molecular logic gate 
Parker and Williams constructed a NAND logic gate based on turning on strong emission from a terbium complex of phenanthridine. In the system depicted in Figure 8, when acid and oxygen (the two inputs) are absent (input “0”), the fluorescence from the terbium center is turned on (output “1”). Hence, the system acts as a molecular NAND gate.

NOR molecular logic gate 
Akkaya and coworkers demonstrated a molecular NOR gate using a boradiazaindacene system, depicted in Figure 9. Fluorescence of the highly-emissive boradiazaindacene (input “1”) was found to be quenched in the presence of either a zinc salt [Zn(II)] or trifluoroacetic acid (TFA). The system, thus, could realize the truth table of a NOR logic gate.

XOR and XNOR molecular logic gates 

De Silva and McClenaghan designed a proof-of-principle arithmetic device based on molecular logic gates. As depicted in Figure 10 A, Compound A is a push-pull olefin with the top receptor containing four carboxylic acid anion groups (and non-disclosed counter cations) capable of binding to calcium. The bottom part is a quinoline molecule which is a receptor for hydrogen ions. The logic gate operates as follows. Without any chemical input of Ca2+ or H+, the chromophore shows a maximum absorbance in UV/VIS spectroscopy at 390 nm. When calcium is introduced a hypsochromic shift (blue shift) takes place and the absorbance at 390 nm decreases. Likewise, addition of protons causes a bathochromic shift (red shift), and when both cations are in the water, the net result is absorption at the original 390 nm wavelength. This system represents an XNOR logic gate in absorption and an XOR logic gate in transmittance.

In another XOR logic gate system, the chemistry is based on the pseudorotaxane depicted in Figure 11. In organic solution the electron-deficient diazapyrenium salt (rod) and the electron-rich 2,3-dioxynaphthalene units of the crown ether (ring) self-assemble by formation of a charge transfer complex. An added tertiary amine like tributylamine forms a 1:2 adduct with the diazapyrene and the complex gets dethreaded. This process is accompanied by an increase in emission intensity at 343 nm resulting from freed crown ether. Added trifluoromethanesulfonic acid reacts with the amine and the process is reverted. Excess acid locks the crown ether by protonation and again the complex is de-threaded.

Half-adder and half-subtractor molecular circuits 
In compound B in Figure 10 B, the bottom section contains a tertiary amino group, also capable of binding to protons. In this system, fluorescence only takes place when both cations available. The presence of both cations hinders photoinduced electron transfer (PET) allowing compound B to fluoresce. In the absence of both or either ion, fluorescence is quenched by PET, which involves an electron transfer from either the nitrogen atom or the oxygen atoms, or both to the anthracenyl group. When both receptors are bound to calcium ions and protons respectively, both PET channels are shut off. The overall result of Compound B is AND logic, since an output of "1" (fluorescence) occurs only when both Ca2+ and H+ are present in solution, that is, have values as "1". With both systems run in parallel and with monitoring of transmittance for system A and fluorescence for system B the result is a half-adder capable of reproducing the equation 1 + 1 = 2.

In a modification of system B, not two, but three chemical inputs are simultaneously processed in an AND logic gate, as illustrated in Figure 12. An enhanced fluorescence signal is observed only in the presence of excess protons, zinc and sodium ions through interactions with their respective amine, phenyldiaminocarboxylate, and crown ether receptors. The processing mode operates similarly as discussed above – fluorescence is observed due to the prevention of competing photoinduced electron transfer reactions from the receptors to the excited anthracene fluorophore. The absence of one, two, or all three ion inputs results in a low fluorescence output. Each receptor is selective for its specific ion as an increase in the concentration of the other ions does not yield a high fluorescence. The specific concentration threshold of each input must be reached to achieve a fluorescent output in accordance with combinatorial AND logic.

More complex molecular logic circuits 
A molecular logic gate can processes modulators much like the setup seen in de Silva’s proof-of-principle, but incorporating different logic gates on the same molecule is challenging. Such a function is called integrated logic and is exemplified by the BODIPY-based, half-subtractor logic gate illustrated by Coskun, Akkaya, and their colleagues (as shown in Figure 13). When monitored at two different wavelengths, 565 and 660 nm, XOR and INHIBIT logic gates operations are realized at the respective wavelengths. Optical studies of this compound in THF reveal an absorbance peak at 565 nm and an emission peak at 660 nm. Addition of an acid results in a hypsochromic shift of both peaks as protonation of the tertiary amine results in an internal charge transfer. The colour of the emission observed is yellow. Upon the addition of a strong base, the phenolic hydroxyl group is rendered deprotonated, resulting in a photoinduced electron transfer, which in turn renders the molecule non-emissive. Upon addition of both an acid and a base, the emission of the molecule is observed as red, as the tertiary amine would not be protonated while the hydroxyl group would remain protonated, resulting in the absence of both PET and intramolecular charge transfer (ICT). Due to the great difference in emission intensity, this single molecule is capable of carrying out an arithmetic operation - subtraction - at a nanoscale level.

A full adder system based on fluorescein has also been constructed by Shanzer et al. The system is able to compute 1+1+1=3.

Potential applications 
Over the years, the utility of molecular logic gates has been explored in a wide range of fields such as chemical and biological detection, the pharmaceutical and food industries, and the emerging fields of nanomaterials and chemical computing.

Chemical detection of ions 
Fluoride (F-) and acetate (CH3COO-) anions are among the most important ones in the context of human health and well-being. The former, though used extensively in health care, is known for its toxicity and corrosiveness. The latter can cause alkalosis and affect metabolic pathways beyond a certain concentration. Hence, it is crucial to develop methods to detect these anions in aqueous media. Bhat et al. constructed an INHIBIT gate with receptors that bind selectively to F‑ and CH3COO- anions. The system used changes in absorbance as a colorimetric-based output to detect the concentration of anions.  

Wen and coworkers also designed an INHIBIT molecular logic gate with Fe3+ and EDTA as the inputs and a fluorescence output for the detection of ferric ions in solutions. The fluorescence of the system is quenched if and only if Fe3+ input is present and EDTA is absent.

Heavy metal ions provide a persistent threat to human health because of their inherent toxicity and low degradability. Several molecular logic gate-based systems have been constructed to detect ions such as Cd2+, Hg2+/Pb2+, and Ag+. In their work, Chen and coworkers demonstrated that logic gate-based systems could be used to detect Cd2+ ions in rice samples, thereby widening the scope of the field to safety detection in food materials, too.

Biological applications 
The effectiveness of methods such as chemotherapy to treat cancer tends to plateau after some initial time as the cells undergo molecular changes that render them insensitive to the effect of anticancer drugs.  Hence, it is imperative to detect the presence of cancerous cells early. An important biomarker, microRNA (miRNA), is crucial in this detection via its expression patterns. Zhang et al. have demonstrated an INHIBIT-OR gate cascade for the purpose, Yue and co. used an AND gate to construct a system with two miRNA inputs and a quantum dot photoluminescence output, and Peng et al. also constructed an AND gate-based dual-input system for the simultaneous detection of miRNAs from tumor cells.

Akkaya et al. illustrated the application of a logic gate for photodynamic therapy in their work. A bodipy dye attached to a crown-ether and two pyridyl groups separated by spacers (as shown in Figure 14) works according to an AND logic gate. The molecule works as a photodynamic agent upon irradiation at 660 nm under conditions of relatively high sodium and proton ion concentrations by converting triplet oxygen to cytotoxic singlet oxygen. This prototypical example would take advantage of the higher sodium levels and lower pH in tumor tissue compared to the levels in normal cells. When these two cancer-related cellular parameters are satisfied, a change is observed in the absorbance spectrum. This technique could be useful for the treatment of malignant tumors as it is non-invasive and specific.

DNA computing and logic calculation 
The concept of DNA computing came about as a way to address storage density issues because of the exploding volumes of data information. Theoretically, a gram of single-stranded DNA is capable of storing over 400 exabytes (order of 1020 bytes) of data at a density of two bits per nucleotide. Leonard Adleman is credited with having established the field in 1994. Recently, molecular logic gate systems have been utilized in DNA computing models.

Massey and coworkers constructed photonic DNA molecular logic circuits using cascades of AND, OR, NAND, and NOR molecular logic gates. They used lanthanide complexes as fluorescent markers, and their luminescent outputs were detected by FRET-based devices at the terminals of DNA strands. Works by Campbell et al. on demonstrating NOT, AND, OR, and XNOR logic systems based on DNA crossover tiles, Bader and co. on manipulating the DNA G-quadruplex structure to realize YES, AND, and OR logic operations, and Chatterjee and coworkers on constructing logic gates using reactive DNA hairpins on DNA origami surfaces are some examples that mark the progress in the field of logic gate-based DNA computing.

Nanorobotics and advanced machines 
Nanorobots have the potential to transform drug delivery processes and biological computing. Llopis-Lorente and co. developed a nanorobot that can perform logic operations and process information on glucose and urea. Thubagere and coworkers designed a DNA molecular nanorobot capable of sorting chemical cargo. The system could work without additional power as the robot was capable of walking across the DNA origami surface on its two feet. It also had an arm to transport cargo.  

Molecular sequential logic is exemplified by Margulies et al., where they demonstrate a molecular keypad lock resembling the processing capabilities of an electronic security device which is equivalent to incorporates several interconnected AND logic gates in parallel. The molecule mimics an electronic keypad of an automated teller machine (ATM). The output signals are dependent not only on the combination of inputs but also on the correct order of inputs; i.e. the correct password must be entered. The molecule was designed using pyrene and fluorescein fluorophores connected by a siderophore, which binds to Fe(III), and the acidic of the solution changes the fluorescence properties of the fluorescein fluorophore.

Molecular logic gate systems can theoretically overcome the problems arising when semiconductors approach nano-dimensions. Molecular logic gates are more versatile than their silicon counterparts, with phenomena such as superposed logic unavailable to semiconductor electronics. Dry molecular gates, such as the one demonstrated by Avouris and colleagues, prove to be possible substitutes for semiconductor devices due to their small size, similar infrastructure, and data processing abilities. Avouris revealed a NOT logic gate composed of a bundle of carbon nanotubes. The nanotubes are doped differently in adjoining regions creating two complementary field effect transistors, and the bundle operates as a NOT logic gate only when satisfactory conditions are met.

See also

 Molecular scale electronics
 Molecular machine
 Chemical computer
 Host-guest chemistry
 Molecular switch
 Photoswitch
 Molecular memory
 Quantum computing
 Unconventional computing

References 
Logic gates
Molecular electronics
Molecular machines
Nanoelectronics
Supramolecular chemistry

External links 

 The 3rd International Conference on Molecular Sensors & Molecular Logic Gates (MSMLG) was held on July 8–11, 2012 at Korea University in Seoul, Korea.